Mayhem Festival 2014 was the seventh annual Mayhem Festival.  Dates were announced on February 18, 2014, and lineup officially announced March 31, 2014.
 
In a January 2014 video interview at NAMM, Korn guitarist James 'Munky' Shaffer revealed that Korn and Avenged Sevenfold would headline the 2014 Mayhem Festival. On March 5, over 3 weeks ahead of the scheduled official announcement, nearly the entire lineup leaked.

Mayhem Festival 2014 lineup

Mainstage
 Avenged Sevenfold
 Korn
 Asking Alexandria
 Trivium

Coldcock American Herbal Whiskey Stage
 Cannibal Corpse
 Suicide Silence
 Miss May I
 Mushroomhead
 Texas Hippie Coalition
 King 810
 Hell or Highwater

Sumerian Records / Headbang For The Highway Stage
 Body Count 
 Upon a Burning Body
 Veil of Maya
 Darkest Hour
 "Headbang For The Highway"

Victory Records Stage
 Emmure
 Ill Niño
 Wretched
 Islander
 Erimha
 Second Pass

Dates 

A number of the dates were scheduled to feature altered lineups:
 Denver (Main Stage acts only: Avenged Sevenfold, Korn, Asking Alexandria, Trivium and Body Count)
 Wantagh (Main Stage acts only: Avenged Sevenfold, Korn, Asking Alexandria, Trivium)
 San Bernardino + Mountain View (Emmure did not perform at these shows)
 Houston (Main stage and Coldcock Stage artists, as well as Body Count and Emmure. King 810 did not perform)
 Milwaukee featured 18 bands, but Avenged Sevenfold and Korn did not perform (dubbed "A Taste Of Rockstar Energy Drink Mayhem Festival")

References 

Mayhem Festival by year
2014 in American music
2014 music festivals
2014 festivals in the United States
July 2014 events in the United States
August 2014 events in the United States